The Champion was a British weekly boys' story paper published by Amalgamated Press, which ran from January 28, 1922, until March 19, 1955. Its original editor was Francis Addington Symonds. From 1929 until 1940 it had a monthly, pocket-sized companion paper, The Champion Library, containing characters from The Champion and its sister paper The Triumph. The Triumph eventually was merged into The Champion in 1942.

The title was revived as a comics magazine in 1966 for a short-lived publication which merged with Lion later that year.

Characters
Rockfist Rogan
Clint Morgan - Hunter of Grey Mask
Jet Jackson
Ginger Nutt
Colwyn Dane
Kalgan - The Jungle Boxer
Dixie Jim
Johnny Fleetfoot - The Redskin Winger 
Kangaroo Kennedy
Punch McPhee
Trapper Pete and his Racing Huskies
Danny of the Dazzlers

See also

Ted Cowan

References

1922 establishments in the United Kingdom
1955 disestablishments in the United Kingdom
British boys' story papers
Weekly magazines published in the United Kingdom
Defunct British comics
Magazines established in 1922
Magazines disestablished in 1955